Anthony Soubervie (born  24 April 1984) is a French Guianan professional footballer who plays as a right-back for Championnat National 2 club Bergerac.

Early life
Soubervie began playing football at the age of 5. A product of the Bordeaux youth academy, he was formerly teammates with Mathieu Valbuena, Rio Mavuba and Marouane Chamakh.

Club career
With Rouen in 2012–13, Soubervie helped the club achieve a place in promotion to the Ligue 2 but the club went bankrupt and was relegated to the Division d'Honneur.

Looking for a right-back, then Colmar coach Didier Ollé-Nicolle contacted Soubervie, whom he knew from his Rouen days, knowing he would adapt well to the club. He then signed for them, accumulating four goals and seven assists that season.

On 8 July 2021, Soubervie moved to Bourg-en-Bresse.

References

External links
 
 

Living people
1984 births
Sportspeople from Cayenne
Association football defenders
French Guianan footballers
French footballers
French people of French Guianan descent
French Guiana international footballers
Championnat National 2 players
Division d'Honneur players
Ligue 2 players
Championnat National players
FC Girondins de Bordeaux players
OGC Nice players
Aviron Bayonnais FC players
FC Rouen players
US Boulogne players
SR Colmar players
FC Chambly Oise players
Football Bourg-en-Bresse Péronnas 01 players
Bergerac Périgord FC players
2017 CONCACAF Gold Cup players